Danforth was a federal electoral district represented in the House of Commons of Canada from 1935 to 1968. It was located in the province of Ontario.

This riding was created in 1933 from parts of Toronto—Scarborough riding. It initially consisted of the eastern part of the city of Toronto, bounded on the south by Lake Ontario, on the north and east by the Toronto city limits, on the west by Woodbine Avenue.

In 1952, it was redefined to include the part of Scarborough township south of St. Clair Avenue between the western limit of Scarborough and Midland Avenue. Danforth represented what is now the Greektown area of Toronto.

The electoral district was abolished in 1966 when it was redistributed between Greenwood, Scarborough West and York East ridings.

Members of Parliament

This riding elected the following members of the House of Commons of Canada:

Election results

|}

|}

|}

|}

|}

|}

|}

|}

|}

|}

See also 

 List of Canadian federal electoral districts
 Past Canadian electoral districts

External links 
Riding history from the Library of Parliament

Former federal electoral districts of Ontario
Federal electoral districts of Toronto